Maes Hiraddug is a Site of Special Scientific Interest in the preserved county of Clwyd, north Wales.

It is species-rich neutral grassland which includes notable species including spiny restharrow and the greater butterfly orchid. The reserve is managed by the North Wales Wildlife Trust. It is an example of wildflower meadow which pre-dates modern agricultural land management.

See also
List of Sites of Special Scientific Interest in Clwyd

References

Sites of Special Scientific Interest in Clwyd